Evangelos Averoff-Tositsa (Greek: Ευάγγελος Αβέρωφ Τοσίτσας) (Trikala, 17 April 1910 – Athens, 2 January 1990) was a Greek politician, leader of the right wing party New Democracy (1981–1984), member of parliament, and author.

Life and work 
Evangelos Averoff was an Aromanian. Averoff got involved in public matters from very early on in his life and played a major role in Greek politics for almost 50 years. In 1940 he was appointed Prefect (regional governor) of Kerkyra (Corfu). During the tripartite Axis occupation of Greece, Averoff was taken hostage and imprisoned in Italy. He escaped a year later and created the "Freedom or Death" resistance group, which aimed to liberate Greek and Allied war hostages. In 1946, he was elected to the Greek Parliament as a representative of Ioannina and then went on to serve as deputy minister and minister of Supply, Economy and Agriculture. From 1956 to 1963 he served as Foreign Minister.

During the Greek military junta of 1967-1974, Averoff participated in one of the foremost acts of resistance against the government, the Velos mutiny, for which he was arrested as an "instigator". 
After the restoration of democracy in 1974 during metapolitefsi, Averoff participated in the New Democracy centre-right party under Konstantinos Karamanlis and served as Minister of National Defense in subsequent governments. Following the defeat in the 1981 Greek legislative election and Georgios Rallis' resignation as party President, Averoff was elected President of the New Democracy party, which was then the Major Opposition in Parliament. Following the 1984 European Parliament election, he resigned citing health reasons and was subsequently declared a Honorary President. Parallel to his political career he became a prominent author of novels, short stories, theatrical plays, essays and historical analyses.

Evangelos Averoff was a prominent author of political and historical works, such as "Customs Union in the Balkans" (1933), which the Carnegie Institute awarded, "Fire and Axe, 1944–1949" (1974) dealing with the Greek Civil War, and "A History of missed opportunities: The Cypriot Problem 1956–1963" (1981). He died on 2 January 1990 at the age of 79.

Historical tradition
For the Aromanians of Metsovo, Evangelos Averof is the last representative of a long tradition of local benefactors. He played a leading role in the founding of the Foundation of Baron Michael Tositsas, which he ran for 40 years, thus contributing greatly to the contemporary development of the town of Metsovo. Fulfilling the wish of Baron Michael Tossizza that the President of the Foundation bear his family name, he then added the surname Tossizza to his surname.

Evangelos Averof Foundation
He also founded the Evangelos Averof-Tositsas Foundation,to which he donated his significant personal collection of paintings by Greek artists of the 19th and early 20th century and built a gallery to house it. At the same time he invested in local vineyards cultivating the abandoned lands of Metsovo and creating a contemporary winery. After his death (1990) the people of Metsovo honored him by placing his statue in the town's central square.

Critics
In her best-selling book, A Man, Italian journalist Oriana Fallaci accused Averoff of threatening to kill Greek MP Alexandros Panagoulis a few days before Panagoulis' death in a car accident in Athens. According to Oriana Fallaci, Averoff represented the link between the Greek Junta and the political system during the transition period following Metapolitefsi. In particular, Fallaci claims that Panagoulis was in possession of secret documents showing Averoff's direct involvement in brokering the transition from the Joannides Junta to a national unity government led by Konstantinos Karamanlis, keeping himself in charge of managing the relations between the democratic system and the Armed Forces. Averoff's instrumental role in bringing about the appointment of Konstantinos Karamanlis has been confirmed by multiple sources, and Averoff became the Minister of Defense in the 1974 transition government. According to Fallaci, other secret documents showed that Averoff had not taken part in the Greek Resistance during World War II, but instead had been a collaborator of the Italian occupation troops as well as one of the conspirators behind the Velos Mutiny in 1973, after which he apparently collaborated with the Junta and, as a result of his cooperation, was acquitted without charges.

Sources
Evaggelos Averof-Tositsas 1908–1990, Evangelos Averoff-Tossizza Foundation, Metsovo 2000. 
E. Chatzivasileiou, Evaggelos Averof Tositsas 1908–1990 – Political biography, Publ. I. Sideri, Athens
E. Averof – Tositsa, Me logismo kai m’oneiro, publ. Evangelos Averoff-Tossizza Foundation, 1991 
G. Plataris, To Simeiomatari enos Metsoviti [The diary of a Metsovian], 1871–1943, Athens 1972, pp. 288–290

Notes

1910 births
1990 deaths
People from Trikala
Greek people of Aromanian descent
Aromanian politicians
National Political Union (1946) politicians
Liberal Party (Greece) politicians
National Radical Union politicians
Leaders of New Democracy (Greece)
Foreign ministers of Greece
Ministers of National Defence of Greece
Agriculture ministers of Greece
Greek MPs 1946–1950
Greek MPs 1950–1951
Greek MPs 1951–1952
Greek MPs 1952–1956
Greek MPs 1956–1958
Greek MPs 1958–1961
Greek MPs 1961–1963
Greek MPs 1963–1964
Greek MPs 1964–1967
Greek MPs 1974–1977
Greek MPs 1981–1985
Greek MPs 1985–1989
Greek MPs 1989 (June–November)
Greek Resistance members
Greek political writers
20th-century Greek historians
Grand Crosses 1st class of the Order of Merit of the Federal Republic of Germany